The women's 100 metres hurdles event at the 1992 World Junior Championships in Athletics was held in Seoul, Korea, at Olympic Stadium on 17 and 18 September.

Medalists

Results

Final
18 September
Wind: +1.0 m/s

Semifinals
17 September

Semifinal 1
Wind: +0.5 m/s

Semifinal 2
Wind: +0.5 m/s

Semifinal 3
Wind: +0.3 m/s

Heats
17 September

Heat 1
Wind: -0.5 m/s

Heat 2
Wind: -0.3 m/s

Heat 3
Wind: +0.9 m/s

Heat 4
Wind: +0.4 m/s

Heat 5
Wind: +0.3 m/s

Participation
According to an unofficial count, 34 athletes from 24 countries participated in the event.

References

100 metres hurdles
Sprint hurdles at the World Athletics U20 Championships